George Pearman of Bath, Somerset (died 1604), was an English politician.

He was a Member (MP) of the Parliament of England for Bath in 1571 and 1572. He was Mayor of Bath in 1572–73, 1577–78, 1578–79 and 1588–4.

References

16th-century births
1604 deaths
English MPs 1571
Mayors of Bath, Somerset
English MPs 1572–1583